Paulo Rodrigues Barc (born May 10, 1960) is a former Brazilian football player.

Playing career
In September 1993, Paulo joined Japanese J1 League club Verdy Kawasaki. However, he could not play at all in the match in 1993 season. In March 1994, he debuted as defender against Bellmare Hiratsuka in opening match in 1994 season. Although he played 3 matches in March, he could not play at all in the match from April. He left the club in July 1994.

Club statistics

References

External links

1960 births
Living people
Brazilian footballers
Brazilian expatriate footballers
J1 League players
Tokyo Verdy players
Expatriate footballers in Japan
Association football midfielders